Denis Mahmudov (born 6 November 1989) is a Macedonian footballer who plays as a winger for Tweede Divisie club TEC.

Career

Club
In June 2015, Mahmudov signed a two-year contract with Bulgarian club Levski Sofia, but struggled to establish himself as a regular. He officially parted ways with the "bluemen" in January 2016. In May 2016, Mahmudov was released by Banants, going on to sign for Telstar later that same summer.

On 17 July 2019, Mahmudov signed for FC Pyunik of the Armenian Premier League. On 2 July 2020, Pyunik announced that Mahmudov had left the club after his contract had expired. After leaving Pyunik, Mahmudov signed a two-year contract with Roeselare on 5 August 2020.

He started the 2020–21 season in Italy with Serie D fallen giants Siena, but was released from his contract early in March 2021.

On 8 August 2021, Mahmudov signed with Tweede Divisie club TEC.

Honours

Club
PEC Zwolle
Johan Cruyff Shield: 2014

References

External links
 
 
 Profile at LevskiSofia.info

1989 births
Living people
Sportspeople from Veles, North Macedonia
Association football wingers
Macedonian footballers
AGOVV Apeldoorn players
WHC Wezep players
Excelsior '31 players
PEC Zwolle players
Sparta Rotterdam players
PFC Levski Sofia players
FC Urartu players
SC Telstar players
FC Dordrecht players
Excelsior Rotterdam players
FC Pyunik players
K.S.V. Roeselare players
A.C.N. Siena 1904 players
SV TEC players
Eredivisie players
Eerste Divisie players
Tweede Divisie players
Derde Divisie players
First Professional Football League (Bulgaria) players
Armenian Premier League players
Macedonian expatriate footballers
Expatriate footballers in the Netherlands
Macedonian expatriate sportspeople in the Netherlands
Expatriate footballers in Bulgaria
Macedonian expatriate sportspeople in Bulgaria
Expatriate footballers in Armenia
Macedonian expatriate sportspeople in Armenia
Expatriate footballers in Belgium
Macedonian expatriate sportspeople in Belgium
Expatriate footballers in Italy
Macedonian expatriate sportspeople in Italy
Macedonian people of Turkish descent